Rhys Hill (born February 8, 1986) is a Canadian sprint kayaker who competed in the late 2000s. At the 2008 Summer Olympics in Beijing, he finished ninth in the K-4 1000 m event.

References
Sports-Reference.com profile

External links

1986 births
Canadian male canoeists
Canoeists at the 2008 Summer Olympics
Living people
Olympic canoeists of Canada
Place of birth missing (living people)